List of Macross episodes may refer to:
 List of The Super Dimension Fortress Macross episodes
 List of Macross Plus episodes
 List of Macross 7 episodes
 List of Macross Frontier episodes
 List of Macross Zero episodes
 List of Macross Delta episodes